

Crown
Head of State – Queen Elizabeth II

Federal government
Governor General – Adrienne Clarkson

Cabinet
Prime Minister –  Jean Chrétien
Deputy Prime Minister – Herb Gray
Minister of Finance – Paul Martin
Minister of Foreign Affairs – John Manley
Minister of National Defence – Art Eggleton
Minister of Health – Allan Rock
Minister of Industry – Brian Tobin
Minister of Heritage – Sheila Copps
Minister of Intergovernmental Affairs – Stéphane Dion
Minister of the Environment – David Anderson
Minister of Justice – Anne McLellan
Minister of Transport – David Collenette
Minister of Citizenship and Immigration – Elinor Caplan
Minister of Fisheries and Oceans – Herb Dhaliwal
Minister of Agriculture and Agri-Food – Lyle Vanclief
Minister of Public Works and Government Services – Alfonso Gagliano
Minister of Human Resources Development – Jane Stewart
Minister of Natural Resources – Ralph Goodale

Members of Parliament
See: 37th Canadian parliament

Party leaders
Liberal Party of Canada –  Jean Chrétien
Canadian Alliance – Stockwell Day
Bloc Québécois – Gilles Duceppe
New Democratic Party- Alexa McDonough
Progressive Conservative Party of Canada – Joe Clark

Supreme Court justices
Chief Justice: Beverley McLachlin
Frank Iacobucci
John C. Major
Michel Bastarache
William Ian Corneil Binnie
Louise Arbour
Louis LeBel
Claire L'Heureux-Dubé
Charles D. Gonthier

Other
Speaker of the House of Commons – Gilbert Parent then Peter Milliken
Governor of the Bank of Canada – Gordon Thiessen then David Dodge
Chief of the Defence Staff – General Maurice Baril then General R.R. Henault

Provinces

Premiers
Premier of Alberta – Ralph Klein
Premier of British Columbia – Ujjal Dosanjh then Gordon Campbell
Premier of Manitoba – Gary Doer
Premier of New Brunswick – Bernard Lord
Premier of Newfoundland – Beaton Tulk then Roger Grimes
Premier of Nova Scotia – John Hamm
Premier of Ontario – Mike Harris
Premier of Prince Edward Island – Pat Binns
Premier of Quebec – Lucien Bouchard then Bernard Landry
Premier of Saskatchewan – Roy Romanow then Lorne Calvert
Premier of the Northwest Territories – Stephen Kakfwi
Premier of Nunavut – Paul Okalik
Premier of Yukon – Pat Duncan

Lieutenant-governors
Lieutenant-Governor of Alberta – Lois Hole
Lieutenant-Governor of British Columbia – Garde Gardom then Iona Campagnolo
Lieutenant-Governor of Manitoba – Peter Liba
Lieutenant-Governor of New Brunswick – Marilyn Trenholme Counsell
Lieutenant-Governor of Newfoundland and Labrador – Arthur Maxwell House then Edward Roberts
Lieutenant-Governor of Nova Scotia – Myra Freeman
Lieutenant-Governor of Ontario – Hilary Weston
Lieutenant-Governor of Prince Edward Island – Gilbert Clements then Léonce Bernard
Lieutenant-Governor of Quebec – Lise Thibault
Lieutenant-Governor of Saskatchewan – Lynda Haverstock

Mayors
Toronto – Mel Lastman
Montreal – Pierre Bourque then Gérald Tremblay
Vancouver – Philip Owen
Ottawa – Jim Watson then Bob Chiarelli
Victoria – Alan Lowe

Religious leaders
Roman Catholic Bishop of Quebec –  Archbishop Maurice Couture
Roman Catholic Bishop of Montreal –  Cardinal Archbishop Jean-Claude Turcotte
Roman Catholic Bishops of London – Bishop John Michael Sherlock
Moderator of the United Church of Canada – Marion Pardy

See also
2000 Canadian incumbents
Events in Canada in 2001
2002 Canadian incumbents
Governmental leaders in 2001
Canadian incumbents by year

2001
Incumbents
Canadian incumbents
Canadian leaders